Diploderma hamptoni, Hampton's japalure, is endemic to Myanmar.

References

Diploderma
Reptiles of Myanmar
Reptiles described in 1935
Taxa named by Malcolm Arthur Smith